Yuji Tachikawa (立川 祐路, Tachikawa Yūji, born July 5, 1975 in Kanagawa, Japan), is a Japanese racing driver.  He was Super GT series champion in 2001, 2005 and 2013.

Racing record

Complete JGTC/Super GT results
(key) (Races in bold indicate pole position) (Races in italics indicate fastest lap)

Complete Formula Nippon results
(key) (Races in bold indicate pole position) (Races in italics indicate fastest lap)

24 Hours of Le Mans results

External links

Speedsport magazine profile

1975 births
Living people
Japanese racing drivers
Formula Nippon drivers
Super GT drivers
Japanese Touring Car Championship drivers
Japanese Formula 3 Championship drivers
24 Hours of Le Mans drivers
Toyota Gazoo Racing drivers
Team LeMans drivers
Kondō Racing drivers